Hans Grauert (8 February 1930 in Haren, Emsland, Germany – 4 September 2011) was a German mathematician. He is known for major works on several complex variables, complex manifolds and the application of sheaf theory in this area, which influenced later work in algebraic geometry. Together with Reinhold Remmert he established and developed the theory of complex-analytic spaces. He became professor at the University of Göttingen in 1958, as successor to C. L. Siegel. The lineage of this chair traces back through an eminent line of mathematicians: Weyl, Hilbert, Riemann, and ultimately to Gauss. Until his death, he was professor emeritus at Göttingen. 

Grauert was awarded a fellowship of the Leopoldina.

Early life
Grauert attended school at the Gymnasium in Meppen before studying for a semester at the University of Mainz in 1949, and then at the University of Münster, where he was awarded his doctorate in 1954.

See also

Andreotti–Grauert theorem
Grauert's theorem
Levi problem

Publications

with Klaus Fritzsche:  
with Klaus Fritzsche:

References

External links
 
photo of Hans Grauert at Oberwolfach

1930 births
2011 deaths
20th-century German mathematicians
21st-century German mathematicians
People from Emsland
Complex analysts
Johannes Gutenberg University Mainz alumni
University of Münster alumni
Academic staff of the University of Göttingen